During the 2001–02 season Chievo Verona competed in Serie A and Coppa Italia.

Summary 
The club contested its first ever Serie A campaign in the 2001–02 season. The squad was widely expected to be relegated immediately to Serie B, following a surprising promotion in 2001. Coach Luigi Delneri played a 4–4–2 formation with extremely offensive wingers in the shape of Eriberto and Christian Manfredini. The entire team surpassed expectations, and for six weeks during the autumn Chievo lead serie A. In the end the form dropped off a bit, but Chievo almost qualified for the UEFA Champions League, and thus failed to achieve that sensation. Its players became seriously attractive on the market, but only Manfredini and target man Bernardo Corradi actually left the club, both joining Lazio prior to the 2002–03 season. Following the surprising promotion in Serie A, occurred on 3 June 2001, Chievo was widely expected to be immediately relegated to B. However, the club surpassed expectations making the most profit from his 4–4–2 formation: the main roles were acted by Eriberto and Christian Manfredini, who played like offensive wingers. Chievo lead Serie A table for six weeks during the autumnal months, achieving notable wins and matches.

In the second part of season, the form dropped off a bit but the side almost qualified for the Champions League: the fifth place collected lead - in the end - to the qualification for UEFA Cup.

Squad

Transfers

Winter

Competitions

Serie A

Results by round

Matches

Coppa Italia

First round

Group 7

Matches

Statistics

Squad statistics

Players statistics

References

Sources
RSSF – Italian Football 2001–02

A.C. ChievoVerona seasons
Chievo